The 1996 MLB Japan All-Star Series was the fifth edition of the championship, a best-of-eight series between the All-Star teams from Major League Baseball (MLB) and Nippon Professional Baseball (NPB), then-called All-Japan.

MLB won the series by 4–2–2 and Steve Finley was named MVP.

Results 
Championship

Rosters

MLB All-Stars roster

NPB All-Stars (All-Japan) roster

References

MLB Japan All-Star Series
1996 in Japanese sport
1996 in baseball